List of teams and cyclists in the 2007 Giro d'Italia and the results:

Quick Step-Innergetic

Astana

Saunier Duval– Prodir

Lampre–Fondital

Acqua & Sapone–Caffe Mokambo

Ag2r Prévoyance

Bouygues Télécom

Caisse d'Epargne

Ceramica Panaria–Navigare

Cofidis

Crédit Agricole

Discovery Channel Pro Cycling Team

Euskaltel-Euskadi

Française des Jeux

Gerolsteiner

Liquigas

Predictor–Lotto

Rabobank

Team CSC

Team Milram

Tinkoff Credit Systems

T-Mobile Team

References

External links 

cyclingnews.com

2007 Giro d'Italia
2007